Andrew Schuyler Magary (born 7 October 1976) is an American journalist, humor columnist, and novelist. He was a correspondent for GQ, has written three novels, and formerly was a long-time columnist for Deadspin. He currently writes for Defector Media and SFGate and is the author of The Night the Lights Went Out: A Memoir of Life after Brain Damage, a memoir chronicling his brain injury and subsequent recovery.

Early life
Andrew Schuyler Magary was born in Wahroonga, a suburb of Sydney, Australia. He moved with his parents to the U.S. at the age of four months and grew up in Minnesota and Connecticut. Both of Magary's parents and his two siblings are American-born; Magary was born while his family briefly relocated to Sydney for his father's job. He attended the  University of Michigan before transferring to Colby College in Maine, where he majored in English and participated in the drama club. Early in his career, Magary worked in advertising.

Career

Journalism
Magary was one of the contributors to the NFL humor website Kissing Suzy Kolber. He later became a contributor to the sports website Deadspin and became the site's columnist, providing commentary and answering reader mail in an irreverent and often profane style, reminiscent of Bill Simmons's mailbag editorial feature. In addition to the main Deadspin site, he also contributed to its culture sub-site The Concourse and humor sub-site Adequate Man. His annual "Why Your Team Sucks" columns were featured on Deadspin and are currently featured on Defector, in which he roasts every NFL franchise and mocks the weaknesses of both the team and its city. He announced his departure from the site via a post on his personal Kinja page on 31 October 2019.

Magary has worked frequently as a correspondent for GQ magazine. In 2013 Magary interviewed Duck Dynasty star Phil Robertson for the magazine and the article became widely covered for several comments made by Robertson, particularly concerning homosexuality. He has also written articles for NBC, Maxim, Rolling Stone, Comedy Central, New York, ESPN, Yahoo!, Playboy, The Atlantic, and Penthouse.

Chopped
In 2012, Magary applied to appear on an amateurs episode of the cooking competition show Chopped. He posted the answers to the application's questions in an installment of his humor column on Deadspin.

In April 2015, Magary appeared on the ninth episode of Chopped'''s 22nd season, which featured other amateur home cooks, and won the episode's $10,000 prize. After the episode aired, his Deadspin colleague and former NFL player Chris Kluwe posted a satirical review of the episode.

Accident
In December 2018, Magary suffered an accident. He said later: "Nearly five months ago, I suffered a severe brain hemorrhage while I was just standing around at a work party. When I collapsed I fractured my skull. That fracture tore through the inner ear on the right side of my head, rendering it inoperable for good." On 16 May 2019, Magary authored an editorial which laid out the details of his accident and his subsequent recovery. On 12 October 2021, he published a memoir, The Night the Lights Went Out: A Memoir of Life after Brain Damage, about his experience with the injury and recovery.

Resignation from Deadspin

On 31 October 2019, Magary announced his resignation from Deadspin. Since the purchase of Deadspin in April 2019, editorial and journalistic staff had complained about mismanagement, which culminated in the departure of the entire editorial and journalistic staff during October and November 2019.

Post-Deadspin
From August 2019 to September 2020, Magary wrote about politics and culture for Gen, a Medium publication. Since April 2020, Magary has been a columnist at SF Gate, a digital sister-site of the San Francisco Chronicle.

Magary and other former Deadspin writers formed Defector Media in 2020.

Bibliography

Fiction
 The Postmortal & The End Specialist (2011), science fiction novel, nominated for a Philip K. Dick Award and an Arthur C. Clarke Award
 The Hike (2016), fantasy novel
  Point B (2020), fantasy/humor novel

Non-fiction
 Men with Balls: The Professional Athlete's Handbook (2008), sports humor book
 Someone Could Get Hurt: A Memoir of Twenty-First-Century Parenthood (2013), non-fiction memoirThe Night the Lights Went Out: A Memoir of Life after Brain Damage'' (2021), non-fiction memoir

References

External links
 'Someone Could Get Hurt': Q&A with Drew Magary by Kat Kinsman, CNN 8 July 2013
 Drew Magary Interview Guy Code Blog, MTV 14 June 2013
 I am Drew Magary Reddit.com

21st-century American novelists
American columnists
American humorists
Colby College alumni
Colby Mules football players
Living people
American male novelists
21st-century American male writers
1976 births
21st-century American non-fiction writers
American male non-fiction writers
Writers from Sydney
Journalists from Sydney
21st-century American journalists
American male journalists